Cîșlița-Prut is a village in Cahul District, Moldova, located on the border with Romania, about  to the north east of the city of Galați.

Notable people
 Gheorghe Ion Marin
 Andrei Calcea
 Maria Sarabaș
 Dumitru Nidelcu
 Ilie Vancea

References

Villages of Cahul District
Populated places on the Prut